Apelleia is a genus of small-headed flies (insects in the family Acroceridae).

Species
Apelleia vittata Bellardi, 1862
Apelleia grossa (Osten Sacken, 1887)

References

Acroceridae
Nemestrinoidea genera
Diptera of North America
Diptera of South America
Taxa named by Luigi Bellardi